Brittnee Cooper (born February 26, 1988) is an American volleyball player. She played for Rabita Baku for the 2013/14 season in the Azerbaijan Superleague as a middle-blocker. She played collegiately for Louisiana State University (LSU) as a middle-blocker. She was named 1st-team AVCA All-American and SEC Player of the Year in 2009.

Career
Cooper was also a member of the U.S. National A2 team in 2008 and 2009.

Cooper's club, Rabita Baku, won the bronze medal of the 2013–14 CEV Champions League after falling 0-3 to the Russian Dinamo Kazan in the semifinals, but defeating the Turkish Eczacıbaşı VitrA Istanbul, 3-0, in the third place match.

Awards

Clubs
 2013–14 CEV Champions League –  Bronze medal, with Rabita Baku

References 

American women's volleyball players
LSU Tigers women's volleyball players
Living people
1988 births
Middle blockers
African-American volleyball players
Expatriate volleyball players in Azerbaijan
American expatriate sportspeople in Azerbaijan
American expatriate volleyball players
21st-century African-American sportspeople
21st-century African-American women
20th-century African-American people
20th-century African-American women